Georg Umbenhauer (20 September 1912 – 15 December 1970) was a German racing cyclist. He won the German National Road Race in 1936.

References

External links
 

1912 births
1970 deaths
German male cyclists
Sportspeople from Nuremberg
German cycling road race champions
Cyclists from Bavaria
20th-century German people